Avraham Chekol (born 26 January 1992) is an Israeli footballer who plays for F.C. Tira from Liga Alef.

Career
Chekol Played in the youth department of Maccabi Netanya and moved in 2008 to Hapoel Kfar Saba, and played in the first team squad between 2011 and 2013.

Chekol signed at Hapoel Tel Aviv in the end of June 2013.

References

External links
 

1992 births
Living people
Israeli footballers
Jewish Israeli sportspeople
Hapoel Kfar Saba F.C. players
Hapoel Tel Aviv F.C. players
Hapoel Jerusalem F.C. players
Maccabi Sha'arayim F.C. players
Maccabi Herzliya F.C. players
Hapoel Nir Ramat HaSharon F.C. players
Hapoel Umm al-Fahm F.C. players
Hakoah Maccabi Amidar Ramat Gan F.C. players
Maccabi Ironi Tamra F.C. players
F.C. Tira players
Liga Leumit players
Israeli Premier League players
Footballers from Netanya
Israeli people of Ethiopian-Jewish descent
Sportspeople of Ethiopian descent
Israel under-21 international footballers
Association football fullbacks